The 1936 Centenary Gentlemen football team was an American football team that represented the Centenary College of Louisiana as a member of the Southern Intercollegiate Athletic Association during the 1936 college football season. In their third year under head coach Curtis Parker, the team compiled a 6–4–2 record.

Schedule

References

Centenary
Centenary Gentlemen football seasons
Centenary Gentlemen football